Many species of fungi produce secondary metabolites called mycotoxins. These toxins can be very detrimental to both humans and animals. The side-effects of ingesting these toxic substances are called mycotoxicosis, which can be a variety of medical conditions. The most common fungi that produce mycotoxins include Fusarium, Aspergillus, and Penicillium.

Some other fungi that are known to produce mycotoxins include Claviceps and Alternaria.

Effects on animals

There are six known types of mycotoxins that affect animals.

Effects on feed production

The most common mycotoxin is aflatoxin. It can be very carcinogenic to both humans and animals. Aflatoxin is produced by two species of Aspergillus, A. flavus and A. parasiticus, which are known to affect plants including cereal grains, figs, nuts, and tobacco. Cereal grains are one of the main ingredient in animal feed. The animals most at risk of having serious problems with aflatoxins are trout, ducklings, and pigs, while cattle are less at risk.

Another animal feed product is  genetically altered grass and animals including cattle, sheep, and horses eat tons of it. Ergot alkaloids are associated with grasses that are produced in a structure of Claviceps called the sclerotia. Some of the conditions that result from ergot ingestion in animals include gangrene, abortion, convulsions, hypersensitivity, and ataxia.

Fumonisins were the most recent mycotoxin found to affect humans and animals negatively. The most produced toxin for this group of fungi is fumonisin B1. Studies have shown that it can cause diseases such as equine leukoencephalomalacia in horses, hydrothorax and porcine pulmonary edema in swine, and it can negatively affect the immune system.

Mycotoxin prevention

Studies on mycotoxins show that there are three ways to preventing them from contaminating feed. The first occurs before there is a possibility of fungal infection. The second is when the fungi are starting to produce the toxins. And the final way to prevent contamination is when the material is known to be heavily infected.

Other methods of prevention include planting species that are able to defend naturally against mycotoxins, proper fertilization, weed control, and proper crop rotation. The way the crops are stored after harvesting also plays an important role in staying mycotoxin free. If there is too much moisture then fungi have a better chance of growing and producing mycotoxins. Along with moisture levels, factors such as temperature, grain condition, and the presence of chemical or biologicalcan determine whether or not mycotoxin producing fungi will grow.

Decontamination of animal feed

There are several different methods being used to remove mycotoxins from feed products. One way is the use of adsorbents that bind with the mycotoxins and pull them away from the feed. Another method for decontaminating feed is with the use of activated charcoal in the form of a porous non-soluble powder that can bind with a variety of harmful substances. Activated charcoal is often used to remove other types of toxins or poisoning that have been ingested.

Turkey X disease

This disease was the turning point for the use of the term mycotoxin. In the 1960s, about 100,000 turkey poults died near London, England due to peanut meal that was contaminated by Mycotoxins produced by Aspergillus flavus. Studies showed that the age group that was most affected was turkeys from two to twenty weeks old. Some of the first signs of Turkey X were neurological symptoms and coma, which would result in death.

References

Fodder
Mycotoxins